Burak Bekaroğlu (born 16 April 1997) is a Turkish professional footballer who plays as a centre-back for Hatayspor.

Professional career
A youth product of Sakarya Tekspor and Sakaryaspor, Bekaroğlu began his senior career with Sakaryaspor in 2013. In 2019, he transferred to Boluspor in the TFF First League. On 7 July 2021, he signed his first professional contract with Fatih Karagümrük. He made his professional debut with Fatih Karagümrük in a 3–2 Süper Lig win over Gaziantep F.K. on 14 August 2021.

References

External links
 
 
 

1997 births
Living people
People from Sakarya Province
Turkish footballers
Fatih Karagümrük S.K. footballers
Sakaryaspor footballers
Boluspor footballers
Hatayspor footballers
Süper Lig players
TFF First League players
TFF Second League players
Association football defenders